Gayang-dong is a dong, neighbourhood of Gangseo-gu in Seoul, South Korea.

Attractions
Heojun Museum

See also 
Administrative divisions of South Korea

References

External links
Gangseo-gu official website
 Gangseo-gu map at the Gangseo-gu official website
 Resident offices of Gangseo-gu

Neighbourhoods of Gangseo District, Seoul